Pitchford is a civil parish in Shropshire, England.  It contains 32 listed buildings that are recorded in the National Heritage List for England.  Of these, two are listed at Grade I, the highest of the three grades, and the others are at Grade II, the lowest grade.  The parish contains the village of Pitchford and the surrounding area.  The largest building is Pitchford Hall, which is listed at Grade I.  Most of the listed buildings in the parish are structures of various types associated with the hall.  The oldest listed building is St Michael's Church, also listed at Grade I.  The other listed buildings include houses, farmhouses, the possible base of a churchyard cross, a memorial in the churchyard, a bridge, and two milestones.


Key

Buildings

References

Citations

Sources

Lists of buildings and structures in Shropshire